Carl Grunert (1865–1918) was a German poet and writer, well known for writing stories, plays and poems. Grunert was a very avid reader, and took interest in the works of Kurd Laßwitz.

References

External links
 
 

1865 births
1918 deaths
German poets
German-language writers
German male poets